Steve O'Donnell (or Stephen, or Steven) may refer to:
Steve O'Donnell (Pennsylvania politician), Democratic nominee for U.S. Representative (PA-18)
Steve O'Donnell (musician) (died 1997), leader of novelty music ensemble Star Turn on 45
Steve O'Donnell (writer) (born 1954), television writer
Steven O'Donnell (Australian actor) (born 1980), Australian television presenter
Steven O'Donnell (British actor) (born 1963), British television and film actor
Stephen O'Donnell (Irish footballer) (born 1986), Irish football player (Falkirk, Shamrock Rovers)
Stephen O'Donnell (footballer, born 1983), Scottish football player (Clyde, Dundee)
Stephen O'Donnell (footballer, born 1992), Scottish football player (Partick Thistle, Luton Town, Kilmarnock)
Steve O'Donnell, software developer and founder of GOAL Systems (see Westi)
Steve O'Donnell, Australian boxer